Vince Oghobaase (born January 24, 1987) is a former American football defensive tackle who currently serves as the defensive line coach for the Boston College Eagles. He was signed by the Hartford Colonials as an undrafted free agent in 2010.  He played college football at Duke.

External links
Just Sports Stats
Duke Blue Devils bio

1987 births
Living people
People from Houston
Players of American football from Texas
American football defensive tackles
San Francisco 49ers coaches
Duke Blue Devils football coaches
Duke Blue Devils football players
James Madison Dukes football coaches
Hartford Colonials players
American sportspeople of Nigerian descent
Ohio State Buckeyes football coaches
UCLA Bruins football coaches